Big Rock Township may refer to:

Big Rock Township, Pulaski County, Arkansas
Big Rock Township, Kane County, Illinois

Township name disambiguation pages